The Zarnja Sourp Khach Armenian Church is an Armenian Church built circa 635 A.D.

The Church contains a symmetrical plan of design with a folded-wall structure and pyramidal disposition. The church has been resistant to earthquake movement, because it has survived to this day.

References

7th-century establishments in Armenia
Architecture in Armenia
7th-century churches in Armenia
Churches completed in 635